Andrea Rau (born 1947 in Stuttgart, Germany) is a German actress and producer who has appeared in several German films as well as appearing in the television series Derrick.

Her most well-known film appearance was in the 1971 Belgian erotic vampire thriller Daughters of Darkness. She appeared on the cover of a large numbers of magazines such as Mayfair, Penthouse, Wochenend or Neue Revue between 1969 and 1978.

Selected filmography
  (1968)
 Charley's Uncle (1969)
 Why Did I Ever Say Yes Twice? (1969)
 Hotel by the Hour (1970)
 Come to Vienna, I'll Show You Something! (1970)
 When the Mad Aunts Arrive (1970)
 Jailbreak in Hamburg (1971)
 Daughters of Darkness (1971)
 Eins (1971)
 Sergeant Berry (1974–1975, TV series)
 Lola (1974)
 Derrick - Season 1, Episode 3: "Stiftungsfest" (1974, TV)
 The Net (1975)
 The Expulsion from Paradise (1977)
 Es muss nicht immer Kaviar sein (1977, TV miniseries)
  (1982, TV series)

Notes

External links

1947 births
Living people
German television actresses
Actresses from Stuttgart
German film actresses
20th-century German actresses